Masebe is an administrative ward in Rungwe District, Mbeya Region, Tanzania. , the ward had a total population of 14,284.

References

Wards of Mbeya Region
Rungwe District
Constituencies of Tanzania